The underworld is a place in religion and mythology to where the souls of the recently departed go.

Underworld may also refer to:
 Greek underworld, the Greek version
 Criminal underworld, another name for organized crime
 Hell in Christianity, sometimes used more favorably than "hell"

Comics
 Underworld (comics), a Marvel Comics character
 Underworld (comic strip), an adult comic strip by Kaz

Computer games
 Tomb Raider: Underworld, released in 2008, the eighth game in the Tomb Raider series
 Ultima Underworld, series of computer games first released in 1992
 Underworld: The Eternal War, a 2004 PlayStation 2 game based on the 2003 film
 Underwurlde, 1984 computer game featuring Sabreman

Film and television
 Underworld (1927 film), a silent film directed by Josef von Sternberg
 Underworld (1937 film), an Oscar Micheaux film
 Underworld (1985 film), a horror film written by Clive Barker
 Underworld (1996 film), a comedy/thriller film starring Denis Leary and Joe Mantegna
 Underworld (film series), a horror/action film series with five installments
 Underworld (2003 film), the first movie, released in 2003
 Underworld: Evolution, the 2006 sequel
 Underworld: Rise of the Lycans, the 2009 prequel
 Underworld: Awakening, 2012, fourth movie in the series
 Underworld: Blood Wars, 2016, fifth movie in the series
 Underworld (2004 film), a 2004 Sri Lankan film
 Underworld (Doctor Who), a serial in the British science fiction television series Doctor Who
 Underworld Trilogy, 2010 drama/thriller television series
 Cities of the Underworld, a documentary television series

Literature
 Underworld (novel), a 1997 novel written by Don DeLillo
 Underworld: The Mysterious Origins of Civilization, a non-fiction work of historical speculation written by Graham Hancock
 Resident Evil: Underworld, the fourth entry in S.D. Perry's series of novels based on Capcom's franchise of videogames, Resident Evil
 Underworld (Reginald Hill novel), a 1988 novel from the Dalziel and Pascoe series
 Underworld (Doctor Who novel), novelization of the television episode
 Underworld (film series novels), novelizations of the Underworld film series and an original novel based on the setting

Music
 Underworld (band), a British electronic music band
 Underworld (Adagio album), a 2003 album
 Underworld (Divinyls album), a 1996 album
 Underworld (Symphony X album), a 2015 album
 Underworld (Vamps album), a 2017 album
 Underworld (Tonight Alive album), a 2018 album
 Camden Underworld, a music venue and nightclub located under The World's End pub in Camden Town, London

See also 
 Netherworld (disambiguation)
Hollow Earth (disambiguation)